The Nike Apache, also known as Argo B-13, was a two-stage sounding rocket developed by Aerolab, later Atlantic Research, for use by the United States Air Force and NASA. It became the standard NASA sounding rocket and was launched over 600 times between 1961 and 1978.

Development
The TE-307-2 Apache rocket motor was developed by Thiokol as an improvement of its Cajun series of rockets; the Apache was similar in appearance to Cajun, but had an improved propellant that allowed for better performance.

Operational history
The first launch of Nike-Apache was conducted by the United States Air Force on 17 February 1961. Popular due to its low cost (US$6,000) and ability to be fired from many locales, 636 launches were conducted between 1961 and 1978, with the final launch of a Nike-Apache taking place in September 1978.

The Nike Apache was used to carry a variety of payloads to study a wide range of topics including radio astronomy, meteorology, aeronomy, atmospheric conditions, plasma physics, and solar physics. NASA flew them from Brazil, Canada, India, Norway, Pakistan, Spain, Suriname, Sweden, all across the US, and off of the converted escort carrier . Nike Apache was the first rocket launched by India from the TERLS (Thumba Equatorial Rocket Launching Station) of Kerala in November 1963.

The Nike-Apache configuration was also used by one variation of the U.S. Army's MQR-13 BMTS target rocket.

References
Citations

Bibliography

External links

 Nike-Apache rocket performance handbook at NASA Technical Reports Server
 Nike Apache at Encyclopedia Astronautica

NASA space launch vehicles
Nike (rocket family)
Equipment of the United States Air Force